Pimp is a British thriller film in the mockumentary vein of Man Bites Dog. It had a multi-platform release on 21 May 2010. It is written and directed by Robert Cavanah who also plays the title role, it also starred Danny Dyer, Billy Boyd, Martin Compston, Gemma Chan, Scarlett Alice Johnson, Barbara Nedeljáková.

Plot
A week in the life of a Soho pimp - Woody (Robert Cavanah) as seen through the lens of a documentary camera team: A week which spirals brutally out of control when the Chinese up their muscle  on Woody's boss's (Danny Dyer) territory, a girl goes missing, and a snuff webcast appears, showing a former employee being murdered, with another potential webcast impending.

Cast
Robert Cavanah as Woody
Billy Boyd as the Chief
Martin Compston as the Zeb
Gemma Chan as Bo
Corey Johnson as the Axel
Scarlett Alice Johnson as Lizzy
Barbara Nedeljakova as Petra
Danny Dyer as Stanley
Wil Johnson as Byron
Angel Amieva as cameraman

Reception

Critical response
Pimp has been panned by critics. It holds a rare 0% approval rating on Rotten Tomatoes, based on 13 reviews, with an average score of 2.2 out of 10. Mark Kermode gave the film a scathing review, noting that "staggeringly, Danny Dyer is miscast" as a mob boss and said that his performance would be "funny if it wasn't so pathetic and tragic." Cath Clarke in The Guardian described Pimp as "snoringly predictable...With nil insight – into the sex industry or anything else – you might conclude Pimp is a film for men who get their kicks watching Dyer strut around leering at topless women who – in the parlance of the film – look like "the basic pleasure model". Ellen E. Jones in Total Film stated : "You wouldn't think a film could actually be both very boring and very offensive. Pimp is that paradox made flesh."
British film historian I.Q. Hunter, discussing the question "What is the worst British film ever made?", listed Pimp as one of the candidates for that title.

Box office
The film only grossed £205 and was pulled from cinemas after only one screening on its opening day.

Home media
The film was released on DVD and Blu-ray on 24 May 2010, just four days after it was released in cinemas.

References

External links

2010 films
British thriller films
British mockumentary films
2010 directorial debut films
2010s English-language films
2010s British films